The brothers David (2 July 1840 - 4 June 1892), John E. (1838 - 23 June 1920) and  George Elliott Jardine (1841 - 1902) were architects of Scottish nationality, sons of a Scottish architect-builder, Archibald Jardine,  of Whithorn, Wigtownshire; they took up American citizenship and practiced in New York City, forming "one of the more prominent, prolific and versatile architectural firms in the city in the second half of the 19th century". From 1865 they practiced as David and John Jardine or D. & J. Jardine, later taking into partnership their brother George Elliott Jardine and Jay H. Van Norden.  At David's death in 1892 the firm was reorganized as Jardine, Kent & Jardine and then practiced as Jardine, Hill & Murdock.

The first emigrant was David Jardine, who arrived in New York in 1860 and served  in the office of Edward Thompson, with whom he became an associate, as Thompson & Jardine, 1858–60, when he was joined in independent practice by his brother John and then about 1887 they were joined by a second brother, George, associated as a partner.

As a young immigrant, John E. Jardine designed several monitors and gunboats for the Union Army during the American Civil War. From 1865 he was in partnership with his brother. He was a vice-president of the Scottish-American St Andrew's Society when Andrew Carnegie decided to fund a system of branch libraries for the New York Public Library and Jardine's office designed several of them. Jardine took his life after suffering for some time with depression, 23 June 1920. John E. Jardine's papers are conserved at the North Baker research Library of the California Historical Society, San Francisco.

Buildings

The Jardine partners designed and built a series of commercial and residential structures in New York, including a series of cast-iron fronts:
40 Worth Street (1926) 
458 Greene Street (1868)
130 East 38th Street (1868–69) for the real estate speculator A. B. Embury.
319 Broadway (1869–70).
678 Broadway, between Great Jones and East 4th Streets (1874) one of a pair of cast iron commercial structures for General Thomas Davies.
The B. Altman building, 6th Avenue and 18th Street (1876–80).
The Wilbraham (1888–90), at 282-284 Fifth Avenue at the corner of 30th Street, as a bachelor apartment hotel.
 1 East 64th Street, NYC - built c1873, demolished c1898 (former house of Henry Knickerbocker)
 474 West Broadway, New York, NY - built 1881, Neo-Grecian (also known as 146-150 Thompson Street)

Notes

Architects from New York City
British emigrants to the United States
19th-century American architects